Omagua is a Tupí-Guarani language closely related to Cocama, belonging to the Group III subgroup of the Tupí-Guaraní family, according to Aryon Rodrigues' classification of the family. Alternate names for Omagua include: Agua, Anapia, Ariana, Cambeba, Cambeeba, Cambela, Campeba, Canga-Peba, Compeva, Janbeba, Kambeba, Macanipa, Omagua-Yete, Pariana, Umaua, Yhuata.

Historical and modern distribution

When Europeans first arrived in the western Amazon Basin in significant number in the late 17th and early 18th century, Omagua was spoken by approximately 100,000 individuals in two major areas: along the Amazon River proper, between the mouths of the Napo River and Jutaí River, and in the vicinity of the Aguarico River, a tributary of the upper Napo River. At this time, then, Omagua speakers lived in regions corresponding to modern eastern Peruvian Amazonia, western Brazilian Amazonia, and eastern Ecuadoran Amazonia.

These Omagua populations were decimated by disease, Portuguese slave raids, and conflicts with Spanish colonial authorities during the early 18th century, leaving them drastically reduced. As of 2011, Omagua was spoken by "fewer than ten elderly individuals" in Peru, and by a number of semi-speakers near the town of Tefé in Brazil, where the language is known as Cambeba (Grenand and Grenand 1997).

Genesis of Omagua 

Comparative work by Cabral (1996) demonstrated that Omagua (and its sister language Cocama) exhibit significant grammatical restructuring effects due to intense language contact between a Tupí-Guaraní language and speakers of one or more non-Tupí-Guaraní languages. Rodrigues and Cabral (2003) further suggest that Cocama (and by extension, Omagua) could be considered the outcomes of rapid creolization. Cabral (1996) argued that this language contact transpired in the late 17th century in Jesuit mission settlements, while Michael (2014) argues that the language contact situation responsible for the genesis of Omagua and Cocama transpired during the Pre-Columbian period.

Phonology

Consonants
 

Omagua has thirteen consonants across five places of articulation. /ts/ and /tʃ/ only occur in a small number of words: /tʃ/ may have entered the inventory through loanwords from Cocama or Quechua.

Vowels

Omagua has five vowels: /i, ɪ, ɨ, u, a/. This is somewhat unusual, as there are four high vowels but only one low vowel (/a/).

See also 
Cocama language

References

Bibliography
Cabral, Ana Suelly. 1995. Contact-induced language change in the Western Amazon: The non-genetic origin of the Kokama language. University of Pittsburgh, PhD dissertation.
 .
Grenand, F. and P. Grenand. 1997. Thesaurus de la langue omawa (famille tupi-guarani, Brésil): Analyse comparée des données disponibles entre 1782 et 1990. Chantiers Amerindia. Paris: Centre d’Etudes des Langues Indigènes d’Amérique (CELIA); Centre National de la Recherche Scientifique (CNRS).

Further reading 
 Dietrich, Wolf (eds). "Omagua-Sprache". In: Südamerikanische Grammatiken. Leiden, The Netherlands: Brill | Schöningh, 2011. pp. 411–432. doi: https://doi.org/10.30965/9783657767793_007

External links 
OLAC resources in and about the Omagua language

Tupi–Guarani languages
Languages of Peru
Languages of Brazil
Endangered Tupian languages